The 1989–90 season was the 59th completed season of the National Hurling League, the top league for inter-county hurling teams, since its establishment in 1925. The fixtures were announced on 19 September 1989. The season began on 14 October 1989 and concluded on 6 May 1990.

Division 1

Galway came into the season as defending champions of the 1988-89 season. Dublin and Cork entered Division 1 as the two promoted teams.

On 6 May 1990, Kilkenny won the title after an 0-18 to 0-9 win over New York. It was their first league title since 1986 and their eighth National League title overall.

Antrim were the first team to be relegated after losing all of their group stage games, while Galway suffered the same fate after losing to Wexford in the final round of the group stage.

Kilkenny's D. J. Carey finished the season as top scorer with 1-52.

Table

Group stage

Knock-out stage

Quarter-finals

Semi-finals

Home final

Final

Top scorers

Top scorer overall

Top scorer in a single game

Division 2

Division 3

Division 4

References

National Hurling League seasons
League
League